Janet Louise Godman (born 16 March 1966) is an English former cricketer who played as a right-handed batter. She played two Test matches and seven One Day Internationals for England between 1991 and 1996. She played domestic cricket for Thames Valley, West of England, Somerset, Wiltshire, and Buckinghamshire.

References

External links
 

1966 births
Living people
England women Test cricketers
England women One Day International cricketers
Thames Valley women cricketers
West women cricketers
Somerset women cricketers
Wiltshire women cricketers
Buckinghamshire women cricketers